The Three Calamities is the third and final studio album from Switchblade Symphony. The album peaked at #25 on the CMJ RPM Charts in the U.S.

Track listing
 "Invisible" – 3:56
 "Wicked" – 4:18
 "Naked Birthday" – 4:11
 "Invitation" – 3:23
 "Fear" – 3:59
 "Monsters" – 2:00
 "Therapy" – 4:13
 "Copycat" – 4:52
 "Green" – 7:12 (not listed on the album cover)
 "Into the Sky" – 4:10
 "Anmorata" – 6:39
 "Witches" – 4:19
 "Drool (Mother)" – 5:11
 "Clown" – 5:35

References

1999 albums
Switchblade Symphony albums
Cleopatra Records albums